A sculpture of the statesman and three-time Prime Minister of the United Kingdom, Edward Smith-Stanley, 14th Earl of Derby, is located in Parliament Square, London, England. The sculptor was Matthew Noble and the Grade II-listed statue was unveiled on 11 July 1874.

The unveiling ceremony was performed by prime minister Benjamin Disraeli and those in attendance included Derby's son, Edward Stanley, 15th Earl of Derby, Charles Gordon-Lennox, 6th Duke of Richmond, Hugh Cairns, 1st Earl Cairns, Henry Liddell, 1st Earl of Ravensworth, numerous Members of Parliament and "a large number of ladies". At the conclusion of his speech, following the unveiling, Disraeli said:

The four sides of the granite pedestal have bronze reliefs depicting Derby addressing the House of Commons during a debate on slavery, attending a Cabinet meeting, at a meeting of the Lancashire Relief Committee and at his inauguration as Chancellor of the University of Oxford.

References

External links
 

1874 establishments in the United Kingdom
1874 sculptures
Bronze sculptures in the United Kingdom
Derby
Monuments and memorials in London
Outdoor sculptures in London
Parliament Square
Derby
Derby